Deolindo Augusto de Nunes Couto (1902-1992) was a Brazilian neurologist, professor and essayist.

He was born in Teresina, Piaui, on March 11, 1902, and died in Rio de Janeiro on May 29, 1992. He was the son of Henrique José Couto and Maria Nazaré de Nunes Couto. He went to school in Teresina and São Luís do Maranhão. He received his doctorate in medicine from the National Faculty of Medicine of the University of Brazil.

He occupied many important roles as a professor and practitioner of Clinical Neurology, in which he took higher training in Paris and Berlin. He was the founder and director of the Institute of Neurology at the University of Brazil, which today is called the Deolindo Couto Institute of Neurology. He was Vice-Rector and later Rector of the University of Brazil. He also represented Brazil in numerous events and conferences abroad.

He was a founder and member of the Brazilian Academy of Neurology, as well as an honorary member of the Société Française de Neurologie, the Deutsche Gesellschaft für Neurologie, the Sociedad Argentina de Neurología, the Sociedad Española de Neurología, the American Neurological Association, and many other similar scientific bodies. He received the title of Doctor Honoris Causa from the Federal University of Bahia and the Federal University of Piauí, and the title of Professor Emeritus from the Federal University of Rio de Janeiro.

He was the sixth occupant of chair 11 of the Brazilian Academy of Letters, to which he was elected on October 24, 1963, succeeding Adelmar Tavares, and received by academic Luís Viana Filho on December 4, 1964. He in turn received academic Abgar Renault into the academy.

References

Brazilian scientists